Diego Luis de San Vitores, SJ (November 12, 1627 – April 2, 1672) was a Spanish Jesuit missionary who founded the first Catholic church on the island of Guam. He is responsible for establishing the Christian presence in the Mariana Islands. He is a controversial figure today due to his role in starting the Spanish–Chamorro Wars.

Early life
A son of a nobleman, he was baptized Diego Jerónimo de San Vitores y Alonso de Maluendo. He was born on November 12, 1627, in the city of Burgos, Spain to Don Jerónimo de San Vitores and Doña María Alonso Maluenda. His parents attempted to persuade him to pursue a military career, but San Vitores instead chose to pursue his religious interests. In 1640, he entered the Jesuit novitiate and was ordained a priest in 1651. San Vitores was granted his request for a mission in the Philippines.

In 1662, San Vitores stopped in Guam on the way to the Philippines and vowed to return. Three years later, through his close ties to the royal court, he persuaded King Philip IV of Spain and Queen Mariana of Austria to order a mission in Guam be established.

Mission to Guam
In 1668, San Vitores set sail from Acapulco to Guam. San Vitores called the Chamorro archipelago "Islas Marianas" (Mariana Islands) in honor of the Queen Regent of Spain, Maria Ana of Austria, and the Blessed Virgin Mary. The missionary landed on Guam in the village of Hagåtña and was greeted by Chief Kepuha. Kepuha's family donated land to establish the first Catholic mission on Guam. On February 2, 1669, San Vitores established the first Catholic Church in Hagåtña and dedicated it to "the sweet name of Mary," "Dulce Nombre de Maria."

According to former journalist and Guampedia editor Tanya Champaco Mendiola: "The Chamorros initially welcomed San Vitores and the other Catholic missionaries, and hundreds were readily converted. The nobles of the community may have believed this would elevate their social status while other village chiefs desired priests for their own village, probably as symbols of status. Some islanders apparently also received the sacrament of baptism more than once for the gifts of beads and clothing they were given. This enthusiasm for Catholicism did not last long, however, as several factors quickly came into play, including the conflicts it created in the hierarchal caste system of the Chamorros. The church preached that once baptized, people were equal in the eyes of God. The missionary’s dogmatic zeal was also not well received as the Jesuits shunned long-standing traditional beliefs and practices in trying to assimilate the Chamorros in Christian doctrine. This included the rejection of the Chamorros long-standing veneration of ancestors. As part of the religious practices of Chamorro culture, people had the skulls of deceased family members placed in baskets in places of honor in their homes. The Chamorros believed that this allowed their deceased to have a place to stay and often sought the guidance of their ancestors and favors from them in their daily endeavors. The missionaries told the Chamorros that their ancestors (including parents and grandparents) were burning in hell because they had not been baptized as Christians."

The destruction of venerated ancestral skulls is often cited as a grave and insensitive offense by the missionaries against the indigenous Chamorro people.

After Chief Kepuha died in 1669, Spanish missionary and Chamorro relations worsened, and the Chamorro–Spanish War began in 1671, led on the Chamorro side by Maga'låhi (Chief) Hurao. After several attacks on the Spanish mission, peace was negotiated. Though San Vitores claimed to want to emulate Francis Xavier, who did not use soldiers in his missionization efforts in India, as his model priest, he also felt that a military presence would be necessary to protect the priests serving Guam. In 1672, San Vitores ordered churches built in four villages, including Merizo. Later that year, Chamorro resistance increased.

Martyrdom 
A Chinese man named Choco, a criminal from Manila who was exiled in Guam, began spreading rumors that missionaries' baptismal water was poisonous. As some sickly Chamorro infants who were baptized eventually died, many believed the story and held the missionaries responsible. Choco was readily supported by the macanjas (medicine men) and the urritaos (young males) who despised the missionaries.

In their search for a runaway companion named Esteban, San Vitores and his Visayan companion Pedro Calungsod came to the village of Tumon, Guam on 2 April 1672. They learned that the wife of the village chief Matapang gave birth to a daughter, and they immediately went to baptize the child. Influenced by the slanders of Choco, the chief strongly opposed; to give Matå'pang some time to calm down, the missionaries gathered the children and some adults of the village at the nearby shore and started chanting with them the tenets of the Catholic religion. They invited Matå'pang to join them, but he shouted back that he was angry with God and was fed up with Christian teachings.

Determined to kill the missionaries, Matå'pang went away and tried to enlist another villager, named Hurao, who was not a Christian. Hurao initially refused, mindful of the missionaries' kindness towards the natives, but when Matå'pang branded him a coward, he became piqued and capitulated. Meanwhile, during that brief absence of Matå'pang from his hut, San Vitores and Calungsod baptized the baby girl with her Christian mother's consent.

When Matå'pang learned of his daughter's baptism, he became even more furious. He violently hurled spears first at Pedro, who was able to dodge the spears. Witnesses claim that Calungsod could have escaped the attack but did not want to leave San Vitores alone. However, those who knew Calungsod personally believed that he could have defeated the aggressors with weapons; San Vitores, however, banned his companions from carrying arms. Calungsod was hit in the chest by a spear, and he fell to the ground, then Hurao immediately charged towards him and finished him off with a machete blow to the head. San Vitores absolved Calungsod before he too was killed.

Matå'pang took San Vitores' crucifix and pounded it with a stone while blaspheming God. Both assassins then denuded the corpses of Calungsod and San Vitores, tied large stones to their feet, brought them out to sea on their proas, and threw them into the water.

Recognition by the church 
Oscar Calvo, one of the primary figures in the reestablishment of the Catholic Church after the Japanese occupation of Guam, sought the beatification of San Vitores for many years. Calvo distributed copies of Alberto Risco's 1970 The Apostle of the Marianas: The life, labors, and martyrdom of Ven. Diego Luis de San Vitores, 1627-1672, translated from Italian to English, to raise awareness on Guam. He visited Spain to search for more information on San Vitores and eventually had a copy of The Life and Martyrdom of the Venerable Father Diego Luis de San Vitores of the Society of Jesus, First Apostle of the Mariana Islands and Events of These Islands from the Year Sixteen Hundred and Sixty-Eight Through the Year Sixteen Hundred and Eighty-One, by Francisco García translated into English. Pope John Paul II beatified San Vitores in Rome in 1985.

Cultural references
While San Vitores remains venerated by many, he is also a figure of criticism in indigenous Chamorro art and literature today. The controversy over his bloody legacy in the Marianas remains strong. The well-known Chamorro poet Craig Santos Perez critically considers San Vitores's negative impact in his poem "from achiote" and other works. The spoken-word poet Jay Baza Pascua seeks to rehabilitate Matå'pang's image as a great chief and leader in his poem "A Descendant of Matå'pang."

Academic critiques
Vince Diaz focuses on San Vitores, the canonization movement, and San Vitores's legacy of "mass destruction" among the Marianas' indigenous peoples in his book Repositioning the Missionary.

Cynthia Ross Wiecko describes San Vitores and other Jesuit missionaries as "agents of empire": 

Wiecko also states: 

Robert Haddock on A History of Health on Guam: ". . . as the Spanish eventually quelled the Chamorro rebellion, "peace" was established at the price of the extinction of a race."

Francis X. Hezel writes:

Nicholas Goetzfridt states:

Memorials

The San Vitores Martyrdom Site is listed on the U.S. National Register of Historic Places.

Guam Highway 14 is named Pale San Vitores Road as curves through the tourist areas around Tumon Bay. Blessed Diego Luis de San Vitores Church, which falls under the Northern Region of the Roman Catholic Archdiocese of Agaña, is at 884 Pale San Vitores Road.

See also
History of Guam
Felipe Songsong
 Nicolas de Figueroa
Juan de los Reyes

References

Further reading
Rogers, Robert F (1995). Destiny's Landfall: A History of Guam. University of Hawai'i Press. 
Carter, Lee D; Carter, Rosa Roberto; Wuerch, William L (1997). Guam History: Perspectives, Volume One. 
Goetzfridt, Nicholas J. "A History of Guam’s Historiography: The Influences of 'Isolation' and 'Discovery.'" Pacific Asia Inquiry 2.1 (2011). 
Risco, Alberto (1970). The Apostle of the Marianas: The life, Labors, and Martyrdom of Ven. Diego Luis de San Vitores, 1627-1672.
Winkler, Pierre. 2016. Missionary Pragmalinguistics: Father Diego Luis de Sanvitores’ grammar (1668) within the tradition of Philippine grammars. University of Amsterdam doctoral dissertation. Web access

1627 births
1672 deaths
Spanish Roman Catholic missionaries
Spanish expatriates in the Philippines
Spanish beatified people
Jesuit missionaries
Roman Catholic missionaries in Guam
17th-century Roman Catholic martyrs
History of Guam
History of the Northern Mariana Islands
People of Spanish colonial Philippines
People of New Spain
Spanish East Indies
Beatifications by Pope John Paul II
American beatified people